Stephen C. Foster State Park is an  state park located in the Okefenokee Swamp in Charlton County, Georgia. the park offers visitors several ways to explore the swamp's unique ecosystem.

In November 2016, the park was recognized as a Dark Sky park by the International Dark Sky Association.

The park was named after Stephen Foster (1826–1864), the American songwriter who immortalized Georgia's Suwannee River in song.

Facilities

The state park includes 64 tents, trailer, RV campsites, nine cottages, an interpretive center, the 1.5-mile (2.5 km) Trembling Earth Nature Trail, 25 miles of day-use waterways, three picnic shelters and a pioneer campground

Suwannee River Visitor Center
Located 18 miles northeast of Fargo, the park's Suwannee River Visitor Center features exhibits about the animals, plants and ecosystem of the Okefenokee Swamp and other environmental topics.

Activities

Activities at the state park includes canoe, kayak and fishing boat rentals, guided boat tours, boating (ramp,  limit), fishing, and birdwatching.

References

External links
 

State parks of Georgia (U.S. state)
Protected areas of Charlton County, Georgia